The OsRox Mission (1931) was a campaign for self-government and United States recognition of the independence of the Philippines led by former Senate President Sergio Osmeña and House Speaker Manuel Roxas. The mission secured the Hare–Hawes–Cutting Act, which was rejected by the Philippine Legislature and Manuel Quezon.

History
The OsRox Mission was the ninth mission in a series of missions lasting from 1919 up to 1933. While the previous missions gave the Filipinos good impressions in the minds of Americans, they were marked by misunderstandings among Filipino leaders. The Americans had mixed opinions on whether to give the Philippines independence; some political leaders in the US thought that giving the Philippines independence would result in them losing their power in business.

Hare–Hawes–Cutting Act

The OsRox Mission stayed in the US the longest and secured the passage of the Hare–Hawes–Cutting Act. It would establish the Philippine Commonwealth as a transition government for 12 years, followed by full independence on July 4, 1946. The Hare–Hawes–Cutting Act also reserved military bases in the Philippines for the US and required the Philippines to exempt American goods from customs duties. These provisions were seen as controversial.

In response to the act, two factions arose in the Philippine Legislature: the Antis and the Pros. The Pros, led by Osmeña and Roxas, supported the act as they believed it was the best the Philippines could get. The Antis, led by Senate President Manuel Quezon, opposed the act due to its "objectionable features". They also believed that the act did not truly grant the Philippines independence.

The Philippine Legislature ended up rejecting the OsRox Mission's work for the following reasons:
The provisions governing trade relations between the United States and the Philippines would seriously imperil the economic, social, and political institutions of the country and might defeat the avowed purpose to secure independence for the Philippines at the end of the transition period.
The immigration clause was objectionable and offensive to the Filipino people.
The powers of the High Commissioner were too indefinite.
The military, naval, and other reservations provided for in the act were inconsistent with true independence, violated the national dignity of the Philippines, and were subject to misunderstanding.

Aftermath
 November of 1933, Quezon embarked on the last independence mission to the US to try to secure a better independence bill for the Philippines. He was not as successful as Osmeña and Roxas, as the result of the mission was a near copy of the Hare–Hawes–Cutting Act called the Tydings–McDuffie Act. It removed the provision of military reservations in the Philippines and substituted another for “ultimate settlement as to naval bases and fueling stations." It was passed by US President Franklin Roosevelt and was unanimously passed by the Philippine Legislature.

See also
Jones Law
Butler B. Hare, Harry B. Hawes, Bronson M. Cutting
Millard Tydings, John McDuffie

References

Notes
Halili, Maria Christine. Philippine History: Rex Bookstore, Inc., 2004. 

1931 in the Philippines
1934 in international relations
Philippines–United States relations
1931 in the United States